Prinia is a genus of small insectivorous birds belonging to the passerine bird family Cisticolidae. They were at one time classed in the Old World warbler family, Sylviidae.

The prinias are sometimes referred to as wren-warblers. They are a little-known group of the tropical and subtropical Old World, the roughly thirty species being divided fairly equally between Africa and Asia.

These are birds mainly of open habitats such as long grass or scrub, in which they are not easily seen. They are mainly resident, migration being limited to local cold weather movements. Non-breeding birds may form small flocks.

Prinias have short wings but long tapering tails. They are fairly drab birds, brown or grey above (sometimes with dark streaks) and whitish below. Some species have different breeding and non-breeding plumages. The bill is a typical insectivore's, thin and slightly curved.

Taxonomy
The genus was erected by the American naturalist Thomas Horsfield in 1821. The type species is the bar-winged prinia (Prinia familiaris). The name of the genus is derived from the Javanese prinya, the local name for the bar-winged prinia.

A molecular phylogenetic study of the Cisticolidae published in 2013 found that the rufous-vented grass babbler did not lie within the clade containing the other prinias. Based on this analysis the rufous-vented prinia and the closely related swamp grass babbler were moved to the reinstated genus Laticilla in the family Pellorneidae.

Species
The genus contains 30 species:
 Himalayan prinia, Prinia crinigera – formerly striated prinia
 Striped prinia, Prinia striata – split from P. crinigera
 Brown prinia, Prinia polychroa
 Burmese prinia, Prinia cooki – split from P. polychroa
 Annam prinia, Prinia rocki – split from P. polychroa
 Black-throated prinia, Prinia atrogularis
 Rufous-crowned prinia, Prinia khasiana
 Hill prinia, Prinia superciliaris
 Grey-crowned prinia, Prinia cinereocapilla
 Rufous-fronted prinia, Prinia buchanani
 Rufescent prinia, Prinia rufescens
 Grey-breasted prinia, Prinia hodgsonii
 Graceful prinia, Prinia gracilis
 Delicate prinia, Prinia lepida
 Jungle prinia, Prinia sylvatica
 Bar-winged prinia, Prinia familiaris
 Yellow-bellied prinia, Prinia flaviventris
 Ashy prinia, Prinia socialis
 Tawny-flanked prinia, Prinia subflava
 Plain prinia, Prinia inornata
 Pale prinia, Prinia somalica
 River prinia, Prinia fluviatilis
 Black-chested prinia, Prinia flavicans
 Karoo prinia, Prinia maculosa
 Drakensberg prinia, Prinia hypoxantha
 São Tomé prinia, Prinia molleri
 Banded prinia, Prinia bairdii
 Black-faced prinia, Prinia melanops – usually considered as a subspecies of P. bairdii
 Red-winged prinia, Prinia erythroptera
 Red-fronted prinia, Prinia rufifrons

Species formerly in Prinia but now moved to Laticilla in family Pellorneidae:
 Rufous-vented grass babbler, Laticilla burnesii
 Swamp grass babbler, Laticilla cinerascens

References

 Nguembock B.; Fjeldsa J.; Tillier A.; Pasquet E. (2007): A phylogeny for the Cisticolidae (Aves: Passeriformes) based on nuclear and mitochondrial DNA sequence data, and a re-interpretation of a unique nest-building specialization. Molecular Phylogenetics and Evolution 42: 272–286.
 Ryan, Peter (2006). Family Cisticolidae (Cisticolas and allies). pp. 378–492 in del Hoyo J., Elliott A. & Christie D.A. (2006) Handbook of the Birds of the World. Volume 11. Old World Flycatchers to Old World Warblers Lynx Edicions, Barcelona 
 Urban, E.K.; Fry, C.H. & Keith, S. (1997) The Birds of Africa'', vol. 5. Academic Press, London. 

 
Bird genera